St Killian's College (Irish: Coláiste Naomh Cillian, also known colloquially as Garron Tower) is a secondary school located in the Glens of Antrim area of Northern Ireland. The eponymous tower was established in 1865 as a home for Frances Anne Vane, Marchioness of Londonderry. The teaching college was founded in 1951 while the current incarnation of the school, resulting from the amalgamation of nearby colleges, emerged in 2010 after a series of reforms by the Council for Catholic Maintained Schools.

The school is regularly listed as one of the top performing schools in Northern Ireland and ranked 5th in the A-Level table in the 2019 year.

Historically a grammar school, the school became an all-abilities school in 2010 and renamed St Killian's College after the Council for Catholic Maintained Schools announced it would be focused on transforming every school to all-abilities.

History
The college's building history predates the school by over 100 years. Garron Tower was built in 1850 at a cost of £4,000 as a summer residence by Frances Anne Vane, Marchioness of Londonderry. She had inherited this part of the Antrim estates from her mother, Anne Katherine MacDonnell, Countess of Antrim who married Sir Henry Vane-Tempest of County Durham.

The college was founded as St MacNissi's College, Garron Tower in 1951 as a boarding school for boys. The buildings were acquired a year earlier in 1950 by Bishop Daniel Mageean for use as a boarding school for boys. The school opened in September 1951.

In 2005 the Council for Catholic Maintained Schools initiated a plan to amalgamate St MacNissi's College with two other schools, St Comgall's College and St Aloysius High School, both located in the Antrim Coast Road area. As part of this amalgamation the college was renamed St Killian's and became an all-ability school.

Buildings

Grounds 
The college grounds are situated on a plateau approximately 200 feet (61 m) above the Antrim Coast Road at Garron Point overlooking the North Channel and out towards Mull of Kintyre, Scotland.

The grounds are extensive and include a golf course, several sports pitches, a wooded forest, several gardens and a seawall.

At the south end of the college grounds there is a wooded area noted for containing the grave of the Marchioness's dog, Urisk. The headstone has been preserved into modern times and reads:"Here Urisk lies and let the truth be told, This faithful dog was blind, infirm and old. Deaf to all else his mistress' voice he knew, Blind though he was, his step to her was true. So strong an instinct by affection fed, Endured till Urisk's vital spirit fled. Stoop grandeur from thy throne ye sons of pride, To whom no want is known, nor wish denied. A moment pause, and blush, if blush you can, To find dogs more virtue than in man. And share, "midst all your luxury and pelf", One thought for others out of ten for self."

Main building
The college has extensive grounds which stretch for a mile or so around the main building. This building contains the priests' dining-room, priests' sitting-room, 100 desk study-hall, kitchens, cloakrooms, first-aid room, classrooms, offices, and a food-storage area.

Chapel
The chapel was completed in 1955 with the help of the late Fr Charles Agnew's "Mile of Half-Crowns". On the canopy above the High Altar are the words "Laudate Pueri Dominum" which translates as "Boys, Praise the Lord".

On one of the stained-glass windows that were installed in late 1956, the following words, in very small print, are to be found: "As I am making this window the Hungarians have risen in revolt against Communist/Russian rule in Hungary. October 1956."

Boarding rooms
A 150-room boarding department (now empty) was opened in 1956. Called St Mary's Residence, single rooms made up the majority of this building but at the front ends, there were double rooms, six in total, two on each floor, which were occupied by six of the college priests.

Original stables were the open dormitories of Ardclinis, Trostan and Knochore. On the level above the Ardclinis Dormitory were the rooms of three priests. These old stables now house Music, Languages and Business Studies classrooms. The building is known as St Joseph's.

Sports facilities
The £1.6 million block for IT, home economics, art and science is situated on the site of the old tennis courts.

Beside the wooded area is a small golf course.

At the north end, there are four sports pitches and a set of Hand-Ball alleys (1 closed, 1 semi-closed and 1 open) all of which are the 60 x 40 type of alley.

Behind the squash courts, there is an outdoor basketball court.

Architectural features
The seaward wall of the school has seven cannons facing the sea which are of naval origin from the Napoleonic wars.

Towards the northern end of the sea-wall, there was a gate, lending access to a twisting path down to the Coast Road but the end of this path, where it met the Coast Road, was out-of-bounds. Just across the road and about 50 yards to the north, the Garron Point Post Office was located and the journey between the gate at the Coast Road and the Post Office was fraught with danger.

About 400 yards north of the Post Office, at the bottom of Dunmaul Hill, is situated a "Water Driven" Pump House where in March 1956 a boarder at the college, Terry Fannin, died.

Academics
The school caters for the full range of ability and comprises: Key Stage 3 (Years 8, 9 and 10) - located in the main school building, Key Stage 4 (Years 11 and 12) and Sixth Form (Years 13 and 14).

In 2018, 69% of its entrants achieved five or more GCSEs at grades A* to C, including the core subjects English and Maths.

In 2019 the school was ranked 5th out of 159 secondary schools in Northern Ireland with 92.0% of its A-level students who entered the exams in 2017/18 being awarded three A*-C grades.

Notable students
 Danny Donnelly - Alliance Party Member of the Legislative Assembly (MLA)
 Patricia O'Lynn (born 1990) - academic and Alliance Party Member of the Legislative Assembly (MLA)

References

External links

Official school website

Catholic secondary schools in Northern Ireland
Educational institutions established in 2010
2010 establishments in Northern Ireland